Henry E. Hayne (b.c.1840–d.n.d.) was a politician in South Carolina during the Reconstruction era. A Republican, he was elected to the state legislature in 1870 and as Secretary of State in 1872. While serving as secretary of state in 1873, Hayne enrolled as the first student of color in the University of South Carolina medical school. His brothers Charles D. Hayne and James N. Hayne also held public office.

Born into slavery, Hayne's mother was of mixed ethnicity. His father was a white planter and state politician who acknowledged Hayne and helped him get some education.

Early life and career
Henry E. Hayne was born in 1840 into slavery; his mixed-race mother was enslaved. His father was a white planter and state politician. His father acknowledged him and arranged for him to get some education, to provide social capital to help him in his later life.

Hayne grew up in Charleston.

Military service during the Civil War
When the Civil War broke out, Hayne volunteered for the Confederate Army, but intended to flee across Union lines at a later time. In July 1862, he crossed into Union-occupied Beaufort, South Carolina and enlisted in the 33rd United States Colored Infantry Regiment (formerly known as the First South Carolina Volunteers). Hayne enlisted as a private but was later promoted to Commissary Sergeant in 1863.

Reconstruction era and political career
During Reconstruction, Hayne became active in the Republican Party, which had supported citizenship and suffrage for freedmen. He was a delegate to the 1868 South Carolina Constitutional Convention and supported a poll tax and literacy requirement.

He was elected in 1870 to represent Marion County in the South Carolina Senate. He was next elected as Secretary of State of South Carolina, serving from 1872 to 1877. He succeeded Francis Lewis Cardozo. He campaigned for re-election in 1876 but lost. He left the state afterward.

The legislature had passed a new constitution in 1868 making public facilities available to all students, and while serving as secretary of state in the fall of 1873, Hayne enrolled in the medical school of the University of South Carolina, becoming the university's first student of color. He was majority white in ancestry. The event made national news and was covered by The New York Times; it described Hayne "as white as any of his ancestors". Some faculty resigned in protest. In 1870 the university had hired its first black faculty member, Richard Greener, a recent graduate of Harvard University.

After Democrats regained control of the state legislature and governor's office in the election of 1876, they closed the college by legislative fiat in early 1877. The Assembly passed a law prohibiting blacks from admission to the college, and authorized Claflin College in Orangeburg as the only institution for higher education for African Americans in the state. Hayne completed his education elsewhere.

See also
African-American officeholders during and following the Reconstruction era

References
South Carolina General Assembly: 2007 Resolution honoring African-American government officials during the 19th century
Eric Foner, A Short History of Reconstruction, 1863-1877
Michael Robert Mounter, "Hayne, Henry E." South Carolina Encyclopedia, (2016)

Notes

1840 births
Year of death missing
African-American politicians during the Reconstruction Era
African-American state legislators in South Carolina
Secretaries of State of South Carolina
Republican Party South Carolina state senators
University of South Carolina alumni